San Marino competed at the 2018 Mediterranean Games in Tarragona, Spain from 22 June to 1 July 2018.

Medal summary

Medal table

Athletics 

Men
Track & road events

Field events

Boules 

Men

Cycling 

Men

Shooting 

Men

Women

Swimming 

Women

Table tennis

Taekwondo 

Men

References 

Nations at the 2018 Mediterranean Games
2018
Mediterranean Games